Khatam-al Anbiya Headquarter may refer to:
 Khatam-al Anbiya Central Headquarter of General Staff of Armed Forces
 Khatam-al Anbiya Construction Headquarter of Revolutionary Guards
 Khatam-al Anbiya Air Defense Headquarter of Army